Stenocereus (Gk. stenos, narrow, L. cereus, candle) is a genus of columnar or tree-like cacti from the Baja California Peninsula and other parts of Mexico, Arizona in the United States, Colombia, Costa Rica, Guatemala, Venezuela and the ABC islands of the Dutch Caribbean. The genus has been enlarged by the addition of species from several other genera. A close relative is the peculiar chinoa or chende cactus, Polaskia chende.

Description
The flowers are mostly borne near the apex of the stems and mostly nocturnal. They are considered easy to grow and generally grow slowly.

Stenocereus thurberi (the organ pipe cactus) is a well-known member of this genus and is widely distributed in Arizona and northern Mexico.

The fruit is similar to a dragon fruit. Those of Stenocereus gummosus, acidic and very refreshing, are highly favored by the Seris of northwestern Mexico who call the cactus ziix is ccapxl - "thing whose fruit is sour". It is commonly known in Spanish as pitaya agria, or by the English translation Sour Pitaya. S. griseus (Dagger Cactus) fruits, locally known as iguaraya, are relished by the Wayuu from the La Guajira Peninsula of Colombia.

Stenocereus are often used as ornamental plants in hot and arid regions, and as noted above, some species can double as a fruit crop.

The interior of Stenocereus trunks often grows to form tough, cane-like stakes suitable for certain kinds of construction. The Wayuu use those of Dagger Cactus for building wattle and daub walls, a technique they call yotojoro, after their name for the cactus wood "canes".

Species

Footnotes

References
Anderson, Edward F. (2001): The Cactus Family 
Felger, Richard & Moser,  Mary B. (1985): People of the desert and sea: ethnobotany of the Seri Indians. University of Arizona Press, Tucson 
Innes, C. & Wall, B. (1995): Cacti, Succulents and Bromaliads. Cassell & The Royal Horticultural Society.
 Villalobos, Soraya; Vargas, Orlando & Melo, Sandra (2007): Uso, manejo y conservacion de "yosú", Stenocereus griseus (Cactaceae) en la Alta Guajira colombiana [Usage, Management and Conservation of yosú, Stenocereus griseus (Cactaceae), in the Upper Guajira, Colombia]. [Spanish with English abstract] Acta Biológica Colombiana 12(1): 99–112. PDF fulltext

External links

 
 cactiguide.com

 
Cactoideae genera
Cacti of North America
Taxa named by Alwin Berger
Taxa named by Vincenzo Riccobono